Duke of Denia, is an hereditary title in the peerage of Spain, accompanied by the dignity of Grandee. It was granted to Ángela Maria Apolonia Pérez de Barradas y Bernuy on 28 June 1886 by king Alfonso XII. The tile was originally granted as "Duke of Denia and Tarifa" (duque de Denia y Tarifa) but was separated into two different titles on 22 December 1886 by the Queen Regent, Maria Christina of Austria.

Dukes of Denia y Tarifa (1886)
 Ángela María Apolonia Pérez de Barradas y Bernuy, 1st Duchess of Denia y Tarifa

Dukes of Denia (1886)

 Ángela María Apolonia Pérez de Barradas y Bernuy, 1st Duchess of Denia
 Carlos María de Constantinopla Fernández de Córdoba y Pérez de Barradas, 2nd Duke of Denia
 Luis Fernández de Córdoba y Salabert, 3rd Duke of Denia
 Victoria Eugenia Fernández de Córdoba y Fernández de Henestrosa, 4th Duchess of Denia
 Victoria Elisabeth Hohenlohe-Langenburg y Schmidt-Polex, 5th Duchess of Denia

See also
Duke of Tarifa
List of dukes in the peerage of Spain
List of current Grandees of Spain

References 

Dukedoms of Spain
Grandees of Spain
Lists of dukes
Lists of Spanish nobility